Coccothrinax borhidiana (guano, Borhidi's guano palm) is a palm which is endemic to Matanzas Province in Cuba.  Like other members of the genus, C. borhidiana is a fan palm.

Coccothrinax borhidiana is restricted to an area of less than 10 km2 on raised limestone beaches near the sea and is threatened by development and livestock grazing.

It was named after Attila Borhidi, Hungarian botanist.

References

borhidiana
Trees of Cuba
Critically endangered plants
Plants described in 1978